The Treasure Seekers is a 1979 British-American action film directed by Henry Levin and starring Rod Taylor, Stuart Whitman and Elke Sommer. It was shot on location in Jamaica.

Premise
Two former football players re-unite to search for the lost treasures of the seventeenth century pirate Henry Morgan...

Cast
 Rod Taylor - Marian Casey 
 Stuart Whitman - Stack Baker 
 Elke Sommer - Ursula 
 Jeremy Kemp - Reginald Landers 
 Bob Phillips - Joe 
 Jennie Sherman - Debbie
 Keenan Wynn - Meat Cleaver Stewart 
 Keith Foote - Lincoln
 Dan Jackson - Supt. Prinz 
 Patrick Wymore - Shelley
 Patricia Hornung - Alicia
 Hans Kahn - German captain
 Paul Methuen - Merril Jr
 Joanna Wilhelm - Merril Jr.'s wife
 Dermot Hussey - Stevan

Production
Rod Taylor wrote the script. Filming took place in 1976 but the film only achieved a limited release a number of years later. There were a number of problems during the shoot and post production.

Release
The film was also released under the title Jamaican Gold.

References

External links

1970s adventure films
1979 films
British action films
Films directed by Henry Levin
Films set in Jamaica
Films shot in Jamaica
Seafaring films
Treasure hunt films
Underwater action films
1970s action films
1970s English-language films
American action adventure films
1970s American films
1970s British films